Lorenz Peter Elfred Freuchen (20 February 1886 – 2 September 1957) was a Danish explorer, author, journalist and anthropologist. He is notable for his role in Arctic exploration, namely the Thule Expeditions.

Personal life
Freuchen was born in Nykøbing Falster, Denmark, the son of Anne Petrine Frederikke (née Rasmussen; 1862–1945) and Lorentz Benzon Freuchen (1859–1927).
His father was a businessman.  Freuchen was baptized in the local church. He attended the University of Copenhagen where for a time he studied medicine.

Freuchen was married three times. He was first married in 1911 to Navarana Mequpaluk (d. 1921), an Inuk woman who died in the Spanish Flu epidemic after bearing two children (a boy named Mequsaq Avataq Igimaqssusuktoranguapaluk (1916 - ) and a girl named Pipaluk Jette Tukuminguaq Kasaluk Palika (1918–1999)). The marriage started in 1924  and was dissolved in 1944. In 1945, he married Danish fashion illustrator, Dagmar Cohn (1907–1991).

Freuchen's grandson, Peter Ittinuar, was the first Inuk in Canada to be elected as an MP, and represented the electoral district of Nunatsiaq in the House of Commons of Canada from 1979 to 1984.

From 1926 to 1940, Freuchen owned the Danish island  in Nakskov Fjord. During this period he wrote several books and articles and entertained guests. At this time, Freuchen became heavily invested in socialism and anti-fascism.  Since 2000, the uninhabited island has been a part of Nakskov Vildtreservat, a  wildlife reserve.

Career
In 1906, he went on his first  expedition to Greenland as a member of the Denmark expedition. Between 1910 and 1924, he undertook several expeditions, often with the noted Polar explorer Knud Rasmussen. He worked with Rasmussen in crossing the Greenland ice sheet. He spent many years in Thule, Greenland, living with the Polar Inuit. In 1935, Freuchen visited South Africa, and by the end of the decade, he had travelled to Siberia.

In 1910, Knud Rasmussen and Peter Freuchen established the Thule Trading Station at Cape York (Uummannaq), Greenland, as a trading base. The name Thule was chosen because it was the most northerly trading post in the world, literally the "Ultima Thule". Thule Trading Station became the home base for a series of seven expeditions, known as the Thule Expeditions, between 1912 and 1933.

The First Thule Expedition (1912, Rasmussen, Freuchen, Inukitsork and Uvdloriark) aimed to test Robert Peary's claim that a channel divided Peary Land from Greenland. They proved this was not the case in a  journey across the inland ice that almost killed them. Clements Markham, president of the Royal Geographical Society, called the journey the "finest ever performed by dogs." Freuchen wrote personal accounts of this journey (and others) in Vagrant Viking (1953) and I Sailed with Rasmussen (1958). He states in Vagrant Viking that only one other dogsled trip across Greenland was ever successful. When he got stuck under an avalanche, he claims to have used his own feces to fashion a dagger with which he freed himself.

While in Denmark, Freuchen and Rasmussen held a series of lectures about their expeditions and the Inuit culture.

Freuchen's first wife, Mekupaluk, who took the name Navarana, accompanied him on several expeditions. When she died he wanted her buried in the old church graveyard in Upernavik. The church refused to perform the burial, because Navarana was not baptized, so Freuchen buried her himself. Knud Rasmussen later used the name Navarana for the lead role in the movie Palos Brudefærd which was filmed in East Greenland in 1933. Freuchen strongly criticized the Christian church which sent missionaries among the Inuit without understanding their culture and traditions.

When Freuchen returned to Denmark in the 1920s, he joined the Social Democrats and contributed with articles in the newspaper Politiken. From 1926 to 1932 he served as the editor-in-chief of a magazine, Ude og Hjemme, owned by the family of his second wife. He was also the leader of a movie company.

In 1932, Freuchen returned to Greenland. This time the expedition was financed by the American Metro-Goldwyn-Mayer film-studios.

He was also employed by the film industry as a consultant and scriptwriter, specializing in Arctic-related scripts, most notably MGM's Oscar-winning Eskimo/Mala The Magnificent starring Ray Mala, and featuring Freuchen as Ship Captain. In 1956, he won $64,000 on The $64,000 Question, an American TV quiz-show on the subject "The Seven Seas".

In 1938, he founded The Adventurer's Club of Denmark (Danish: Eventyrernes Klub), which still exists. They later honored his memory by planting an oak tree and creating an Eskimo cairn near the place where he left Denmark for Greenland in 1906. It is situated east of Langeliniebroen in central Copenhagen and not far from the statue of The Little Mermaid.

During World War II, Freuchen was actively involved with the Danish resistance movement against the occupation by Nazi Germany despite having lost a leg to frostbite in 1926. He openly claimed to be Jewish whenever he witnessed anti-semitism. 
Freuchen was imprisoned by the Germans, and was sentenced to death, but he managed to escape and flee to Sweden. In 1945 he married Danish-Jewish designer Dagmar Freuchen-Gale.

As he related in Vagrant Viking, he was friends with the royal families of Scandinavia and other countries, and his movie work in New York City and Hollywood brought him into the 'royalty' of moving pictures and the political world of Washington, D.C.

Later years

Freuchen and his wife Dagmar lived in New York City, and maintained a second home in Noank, Connecticut.

The preface of his last work, Book of the Seven Seas, is dated 30 August 1957, in Noank. He died of a heart attack three days later at the Elmendorf Air Force Base in Anchorage, Alaska. After his death, his ashes were scattered on the famous table-shaped Mount Dundas outside of Thule.

Honours and awards
 Member, Royal Danish Geographical Society
 Fellow, American Geographical Society
 1921 - Hans Egede Medal from the Royal Danish Geographical Society

Freuchen Land in Greenland was named after him and Navarana Fjord was named after his first wife.

Literary prizes 
 1938 – Sophus Michaëlis' Legat
 1954 – Herman Bangs Mindelegat
 1955 – Kaptajn H.C. Lundgreens Legat

Selected works

 Grønland, land og folk, 1927 (Travelbook) Freuchen's first book
 Storfanger, 1927 (Novel)
 Rømningsmand, 1928 (novel)
 Nordkaper, 1929 - The Sea Tyrant (novel)
 Ivalu, 1930 - Ivalu, the Eskimo Wife - suomennettu (novel)
 Knud Rasmussen. Mindeudgave. 3 vol, 1934 (Peter Freuchen, Therkel Mathiassen and Kaj Birket-Smith)
 Flugten til Sydamerika, 1935 (Memories)
 "Arctic Adventure: My Life in the Frozen North", Farrar & Rinehart, New York, Toronto, Copyright 1935.
 Min grønlandske ungdom, 1936 and 1953 (Memories)
 Nuoruuteni Grönlannissa (Memories)
 Min anden ungdom, 1938 (Memories)
 Sibiriske eventyr, 1939 (Memories)
 Diamantdronningen, 1941 (novel)
 Hvid mand, 1943 - White Man - Valkoinen mies eskimoiden parissa (novel)
 Eskimofortællinger, 1944 (novel)
 Solfjeld, 1944 (novel)
 Larions lov, 1948 - The Law of Larion (novel about the inland Indians along the Yukon river)
 Nigger-Dan, 1951 (novel, aka The Legend of Daniel Williams)
 I al frimodighed 1953 (Memories)
 "Ice Floes and Flaming Water", 1954
 I all uppriktighet", 1954 (Memories)
 Vagrant Viking, 1954 (Memories)
 Fremdeles frimodig, 1955
 Fortfarende uppriktig", 1956 og 1960 (Memories)
 Fangsmænd i Melville-bugten, 1956 - Pyyntimiehiä Melville lahdella (novel)
 Fra Thule til Rio, 1957 (Memories)
 "Peter Freuchen's Book of the Seven Seas", Julian Messner, Inc., New York, Copyright 1957.
 Peter Freuchens bog om de syv have, 1959 (Documentary)
 "The Arctic Year", G.P. Putnam's Sons, New York, Copyright 1958. (Peter Freuchen and Finn Salomonsen)
 "I Sailed with Rasmussen, 1958 (Documentary)
 Hvalfangerne, 1959 (novel)
 "Peter Freuchen's Adventures in the Arctic", Julian Messner, Inc., New York, Copyright 1960. (Edited by Dagmar Freuchen)
 Det arktiske år, 1961 - Arctic Year (Documentary)
 "Peter Freuchen's Book of the Eskimos", Peter Freuchen Estate. Cleveland Ohio, Copyright 1961.- (Edited by Dagmar Freuchen)
 Erindringer, 1963 - (Edited by Dagmar Freuchen)

Biography
 Reid Mitenbuler, Wanderlust: An Eccentric Explorer, an Epic Journey, a Lost Age'', HarperCollins, 2023.

References

External links
Peter Freuchen on litteraturpriser.dk (Danish)
Peter Freuchen (Danish)
 Photograph of Peter Freuchen and Dagmar Freuchen (Irving Penn)
 Petri Liukkonen, Peter Freuchen, Authors' Calendar 
 

1886 births
1957 deaths
Anti-fascists
Danish amputees
Danish polar explorers
Danish anthropologists
Danish emigrants to Greenland
Danish emigrants to the United States
Danish explorers
Scandinavian explorers of North America
Greenlandic polar explorers
Danish resistance members
Danish socialists
Danish travel writers
People from Guldborgsund Municipality
University of Copenhagen alumni
20th-century anthropologists
20th-century Danish journalists
Scientists with disabilities